Ahmed Mahmoud Mohamed Juma Ashoori (Arabic:أحمد محمود) (born 30 March 1989) is an Emirati footballer. He currently plays for Khor Fakkan as a goalkeeper .

External links

References

Emirati footballers
1989 births
Living people
Al Shabab Al Arabi Club Dubai players
Al-Wasl F.C. players
Al Ahli Club (Dubai) players
Baniyas Club players
Sharjah FC players
Hatta Club players
Khor Fakkan Sports Club players
United Arab Emirates international footballers
Place of birth missing (living people)
Asian Games medalists in football
Footballers at the 2010 Asian Games
Asian Games silver medalists for the United Arab Emirates
UAE Pro League players
Association football goalkeepers
Medalists at the 2010 Asian Games